Thurovia is a genus of Texan plants in the tribe Astereae within the family Asteraceae.

Molecular analysis has since confirmed the uniqueness of Thurovia.

Species
The only known species  is Thurovia triflora, commonly known as the threeflower snakeweed or the three-flower broomweed. It is native to the coastal plain of east-central and southeastern Texas.

References

External links
Lady Bird Johnson Wildflower Center, University of Texas, Thurovia triflora Rose Threeflower snakeweed
"Thurovia triflora - Rose". NatureServe. Accessed August 9, 2012.

Monotypic Asteraceae genera
Astereae
Flora of Texas